The 1991–92 Slovenian PrvaLiga was the first season of Slovenian top division football. The season started on 18 August 1991 and ended on 21 June 1992 with each team playing a total of 40 matches.

Qualified clubs
After the independence of Slovenia, 16 clubs that were supposed to participate in the Slovenian Republic League were joined by five Slovenian clubs from Yugoslav leagues.

Play-offs

League table

Results

Top goalscorers

See also
1991–92 Slovenian Football Cup
1991–92 Slovenian Second League

References
General

External links
Official website of the PrvaLiga 

Slovenian PrvaLiga seasons
Slovenia
1991–92 in Slovenian football